David N. Thomlinson (born October 22, 1966) is a Canadian former professional ice hockey left winger who played in the National Hockey League for the St. Louis Blues, Boston Bruins and the Los Angeles Kings between 1989 and 1995. The rest of his career was mainly spent in the minor International Hockey League.

Playing career
Thomlinson was selected 43rd overall by the Toronto Maple Leafs in the 1985 NHL Entry Draft, and went on to play a total of 42 regular season games, scoring one goal and three assists for four points, collecting 50 penalty minutes in the NHL. He played in 9 playoff games for the St. Louis Blues during the 1991 NHL playoffs, scoring 3 goals and 1 assist for four points, and collected 4 penalty minutes.

Personal life
Thomlinson was born in Edmonton, Alberta. He played junior hockey for the Brandon Wheat Kings.

Thomlinson is now a lawyer with the law firm of Miller Thomson LLP. He is often confused with another former professional hockey player with a very similar name - Dave Tomlinson, who later worked as a radio personality in Vancouver.

Career statistics

Regular season and playoffs

External links
 

1966 births
Living people
Boston Bruins players
Brandon Wheat Kings players
Canadian ice hockey left wingers
Los Angeles Kings players
Maine Mariners players
Manitoba Moose (IHL) players
Moose Jaw Warriors players
Peoria Rivermen (IHL) players
Phoenix Roadrunners (IHL) players
Ice hockey people from Edmonton
St. Louis Blues players
Toronto Maple Leafs draft picks